Giulino (also known as Giulino di Mezzegra) is an Italian frazione of the Comune of Mezzegra, in  the province of Como. Since 21 January 2014 both Giulino and Mezzegra are included in the comune of Tremezzina.

History

Early history
The village was an autonomous municipality until 1928, when it merged into Mezzegra becoming its frazione (civil parish).

Death of Mussolini

The village has passed into history because it is the place where Benito Mussolini and his lover Claretta Petacci were killed on 28 April 1945, in front of a manor house named Villa Belmonte. The execution was carried out by local resistance fighters (partigiani), who had captured the dictator at Dongo (often erroneously considered to be the place where the execution actually took place).

Geography
Giulino, part of the Intelvi geographical region, lies on the hills close to the north-western shore of the Lake Como. It is 2 km from Mezzegra, 30 from Como and 40 from Lugano (in Switzerland).

Literature
Bruno Giovanni Lonati : "Quel 28 aprile. Mussolini e Claretta: la verità". Mursia, 1994.

References

External links

Former municipalities of the Province of Como
Frazioni of the Province of Como
Benito Mussolini
Tremezzina